DWST  may refer to these callsigns:

 DWST, a radio station in La Union under the brand 101.7 Love Radio
 DWST (1995–98), a defunct radio station in Metro Manila, now 101.1 Yes FM
 DWST-TV, a television station in Tuguegarao with the brand ABS-CBN Sports and Action